Coryse Borg is a Maltese actress, director and writer, resident in Żebbuġ, Malta. She appeared in a range of productions, both in the theatre and in the movies.

She appeared in Gladiator, Helen of Troy  and Revelation. She also has played various parts both in comedies and straight theatrical productions, including Shakespeare and musicals. In 2007 she starred in the Malta Arts Festival production of A Midsummer Nights' Dream, produced by the Malta Council for Culture and the Arts.

She played "Sharon" in the TV series Dejjem Tiegħek Becky. Other Maltese stage roles included: Sylvia in Life x 3, As You Like It, West Side Story and Jack and the Beanstalk.

She has written for a number of other productions, including Malta George Cross, a film on which Borg worked with the assistance of students at the San Andrea School, won Best Screenplay by the Jury of the Documentary and Fiction Festival of Hollywood in 2007.

Her directing credits include Glorious, the story of Florence Foster Jenkins, an MADC production of Audacity,

References

External links

Maltese film actresses
Maltese stage actresses
Maltese television actresses
Place of birth missing (living people)
Year of birth missing (living people)
Living people
People from Żebbuġ